The 1897 San Diego mayoral election was held on April 6, 1897 to elect the mayor for San Diego. Daniel C. Reed was elected Mayor with a plurality of the votes.

Candidates
Joseph S. Bachman
William H. Carlson, Mayor of San Diego
George D. Copeland
C.F. Holland
Abram C. Mouser
Daniel C. Reed, insurance salesman and 1887 mayoral candidate
Henry Sweeny

Campaign
Incumbent Mayor William H. Carlson stood for re-election to a third two-year term as an independent. His re-election was contested by Daniel C. Reed, a Republican, C.F. Holland, a Democrat, and A.C. Mouser, a Populist. In addition to the partisan candidates, three others contested the election as independents.

On April 6, 1897, Reed was elected mayor with a plurality of 39.2 percent of the vote. Holland came in second with 26.2 percent of the vote, followed by the incumbent Carlson with 17.5 percent.

Election results

References

1897
1897 California elections
1890s in San Diego
1897 United States mayoral elections
April 1897 events